Chops is an album by the American jazz guitarist Joe Pass and double bassist Niels-Henning Ørsted Pedersen that was released in 1979.

Reception

Writing for Allmusic, music critic Scott Yanow wrote of the album "Pass in particular sounds stimulated during this session and comes up with some of his hottest playing."

Track listing
"Have You Met Miss Jones?" (Richard Rodgers, Lorenz Hart) – 5:00
"Oleo" (Sonny Rollins) – 5:07
"Lover Man" (Jimmy Davis, Roger "Ram" Ramirez, Jimmy Sherman) – 5:35
"L5 Blues" (Joe Pass, Niels-Henning Ørsted Pedersen) – 5:09
"Come Rain or Come Shine" (Harold Arlen, Johnny Mercer) – 4:20
"Quiet Nights of Quiet Stars" (Antônio Carlos Jobim, Gene Lees) – 5:16
"Tricrotism" (Oscar Pettiford) – 6:05
"Old Folks" (Dedette Lee Hill, Willard Robison) – 4:48
"Yardbird Suite" (Charlie Parker) – 3:34
"In Your Own Sweet Way" (Dave Brubeck) – 5:30

Personnel
 Joe Pass - guitar
 Niels-Henning Ørsted Pedersen – double bass
Technical
Robert Golding - engineer
Phil Stern - photography

References

External links
Joe Pass Memorial Hall

1978 albums
Joe Pass albums
albums produced by Norman Granz
Pablo Records albums